The 11th (North Auckland) Mounted Rifles was formed on 17 March 1911. They were mobilised during World War I as a squadron of the Auckland Mounted Rifles Regiment. They served in the Middle Eastern theatre of World War I and first saw action during the Battle of Gallipoli.
As a part of the larger New Zealand Mounted Rifles Brigade (of the ANZAC Mounted Division) they went on to serve in the Sinai and Palestine campaign.

Great War Battles
Battle of Gallipoli
Battle of Romani
Battle of Magdhaba
Battle of Rafa
First Battle of Gaza
Second Battle of Gaza
Third Battle of Gaza
Battle of Beersheba
Battle of Megiddo (1918)

Between the wars

They became the 9th New Zealand Mounted Rifles (North Auckland) in 1921 and later was renamed the North Auckland Mounted Rifles, which was absorbed into the 1st Armoured Regiment, on 29 March 1944.

Alliances
 – Royal Scots Greys

References

Military units and formations established in 1911
Military units and formations disestablished in 1921
Cavalry regiments of New Zealand
Military units and formations of New Zealand in World War I
New Zealand in World War I
History of the Northland Region
1911 establishments in New Zealand